The name Forest Glen may refer to:

Australia
Forest Glen, New South Wales, a suburb of Sydney
Forest Glen, Queensland, a town on the Sunshine Coast

United States
Forest Glen, Chicago, Illinois, a neighborhood
Forest Glen, Indiana, an unincorporated community
Forest Glen, Maryland, a census-designated place near Silver Spring
Forest Glen station, a Washington Metro station
Forest Glen Beach, Wisconsin, an unincorporated community
Forest Glen Park, Maryland, an unincorporated community
Forest Glen Annex, a U.S. Army installation

Canada
Forest Glen, Nova Scotia